Marieke Josephine Hardy (born 26 May 1976) is an Australian writer, radio and television presenter, television producer and screenwriter and former television actress.

Early life and family
Hardy is the granddaughter of Frank Hardy, author of Power Without Glory, and the grandniece of comedian and radio and television presenter Mary Hardy. Her parents Alan and Galia Hardy were writers, producers and editors on several Australian television series including The Sullivans and All the Rivers Run.

Hardy was raised in the Melbourne suburbs of Hawthorn East, Victoria and Richmond, Victoria.

Hardy was educated at Carey Baptist Grammar School and Swinburne Senior Secondary College in Melbourne.

Career

Radio
Hardy co-hosted Melbourne's 3RRR radio show Best of the Brat on Tuesday nights from April 1996 to December 2007, under the pseudonym Holly C. The show was known as "the most immature show on Australian radio".
Almost immediately following her departure from RRR, in January 2008 she began co-hosting the breakfast show on Triple J, the ABC's youth radio station, with Robbie Buck and Lindsay "The Doctor" McDougall. In December 2009, Hardy announced she was leaving Triple J to concentrate on her writing career.

Television
Working in the entertainment industry from a young age as an actress, Hardy appeared in such television programs as The Henderson Kids II, All Together Now, Neighbours, A Country Practice and various television commercials before pursuing a career as a scriptwriter.

In 2005, Hardy co-wrote and produced a 22-episode drama series for the Seven Network called Last Man Standing. The series struggled to gain ratings for its prime-time slot and was cancelled after one series.

Hardy was a regular panelist (or book club member) on the ABC1 literary review show, First Tuesday Book Club.

After leaving Triple J in 2010, Hardy returned to television writing, working on the Comedy Channel advertising industry sitcom 30 Seconds.

Since 2008, Hardy has written 11 episodes of Packed to the Rafters, starting with the third episode of the first series. She has written episodes for every series up to the fourth.

In 2011, with Kirsty Fisher, she co-created and co-wrote a six-part TV series Laid for the ABC.

Newspaper columnist and blog
Hardy formerly penned a blog called Reasons You Will Hate Me under the pseudonym "Ms Fits" which won a Bloggie award for Best Australia/New Zealand blog in 2008.

She wrote commentary columns for The Age newspaper's "Green Guide" TV section ("Back Chat") and "Life & Style" ("formally A2") section, as well a contributing to Frankie magazine. She resigned from the "Green Guide" in November 2009 due to other writing commitments.

Books
Hardy signed a two book deal with publishers Allen & Unwin, and the first of those books, You'll Be Sorry When I'm Dead, was published in 2011. She began working on the second, a novel, in 2012.

Other work
Hardy started a left-wing political apparel brand with designer Sara-Jane Chase called Polichicks in 2003.

As of October 2008, Hardy became a committed vegan after completing a one-week challenge set by her Triple J co-presenter Lindsay McDougall.

Since 2010, she and writer Michaela McGuire have co-hosted the popular international literary public event Women of Letters, in which five or six women read letters they have written on a set theme.

In October 2010, an article on the Liberal Party politician Christopher Pyne written by Hardy on the ABC The Drum blog site was withdrawn on the grounds that it "failed to meet the standards for argument and well-thought opinion". A public apology was issued to Pyne by The Drum editor Jonathan Green "for both the attack and for its deeply personal nature".

In August 2017, it was announced that Hardy would join the annual Melbourne Writers Festival as the event's Artistic Director. She resigned from her three-year contract, with effect December 2019.

Ancestry

Filmography

Bibliography

Children's fiction
Short Cuts, Angus & Robertson, 2002

Humour
You'll be Sorry When I'm Dead, Allen & Unwin, 2011

Play 

 No Pay? No Way!, Sydney Theatre Company, 2020


References

External links

Marieke Hardy columns on The Drum (ABC)

1976 births
Living people
Australian bloggers
Australian women bloggers
Australian screenwriters
Women screenwriters
Australian people of English descent
People educated at Carey Baptist Grammar School
Triple J announcers
Australian women radio presenters
Bloggers from Melbourne
21st-century Australian screenwriters
People from Hawthorn, Victoria